The Saint-Cyr River South is a tributary of the Mégiscane River (via the Canusio Lake, flowing into Senneterre, in the administrative region of Abitibi-Témiscamingue, in Quebec, in Canada.

The river Saint-Cyr Sud flows successively into the cantons of Bailly, Kalm, Mesplet and Cherrier. Forestry is the main economic activity of the sector; recreational tourism activities, second.

The valley of the Saint-Cyr South River is served by the forest road R1053 (East-West direction) which passes on the north-west side and north of Lac Saint-Cyr. This road joins the road R1009 (North-South direction) which passes to the East of the Aigle River (Doda Lake).

The surface of the Saint-Cyr South River is usually frozen from early November to mid-May, however, safe ice circulation is generally from mid-November to mid-April.

Geography

Toponymy

See also

References

External links 

Rivers of Abitibi-Témiscamingue
La Vallée-de-l’Or
Nottaway River drainage basin